Pauleen is a variant form of Pauline and most commonly refers to Filipina actress and TV personality Pauleen Luna.

Pauleen may also refer to:
 Pauleen Bennett, Australian scientist
 Pauline Nakamarra Woods, Australian actress whose first name is sometimes spelled "Pauleen"

See also
Pauline (disambiguation)